Elisabet Llabrés Ferrer (born 11 September 1997) is a Spanish professional racing cyclist, who last rode for UCI Women's Team .

See also
 List of 2016 UCI Women's Teams and riders

References

External links
 

1997 births
Living people
Spanish female cyclists
Sportspeople from Mallorca
Cyclists from the Balearic Islands